Northwood is a neighbourhood in the city of Thunder Bay, Ontario. It is one of Thunder Bay's seven municipal wards, represented by Shelby Ch'ng. It was developed between 1965 and 1985. It is bounded by Chapples Park to the east, Arthur Street to the south, the Thunder Bay Expressway to the west and the Harbour Expressway to the north. 

Northwood includes many smaller neighbourhoods, such as Edgewater Park, the southernmost third which is located between Arthur Street and the Neebing River; College Park, the part of Northwood generally north of James Street, and Mountview, the area between the two. 

Northwood has one secondary school, Dennis Franklin Cromarty High School, at the corner of Edward Street and Churchill Drive. Sir Winston Churchill Collegiate & Vocational Institute was next to it but closed in 2018. Confederation College is located in the area.

Parks include Chapples Park, the Thunder Bay Soroptimist International Friendship Garden, and the Neebing Watercourse Preserve. Smaller local parks are located throughout the ward.

Northwood is home to Northwood Park Plaza, an indoor shopping mall in the heart of the community. Arthur Street is the location of several strip malls and grocery stores.

Neighbourhoods in Thunder Bay